The KREM New Year's Day Cycling Classic is a single day road cycling race held in Belize since 1991 on New Year's Day, January 1, and is thus the first race on Belize's cycling calendar. The race was restricted to elite and junior men until 2001, when females became eligible to ride. It is considered the second most prestigious race in Belize after the Holy Saturday Cross Country Cycling Classic.

The usual route is over the Northern Highway from Corozal District (at first Corozal Town, now the Santa Elena northern border) to Belize City, finishing at the corner of Central American Boulevard and Mahogany Street, approximately two blocks from the home of the race's sponsor, Kremandala Ltd., located on Partridge Street.

Past winners

References
 Results

Cycle races in Belize
Kremandala Ltd.
Recurring sporting events established in 1992
Road bicycle races
1992 establishments in Belize